The 1997 DFB-Ligapokal was the inaugural DFB-Ligapokal, a pre-season competition in Germany. The Ligapokal was an extended Supercup, including the reigning League champions, Cup winners, plus the next four highest placed teams in the previous season's Bundesliga. It was won by Bayern Munich, the 1996–97 Bundesliga champions, who beat 1996–97 DFB-Pokal winners VfB Stuttgart in the final.

Participating clubs
A total of six teams qualified for the competition. The labels in the parentheses show how each team qualified for the place of its starting round:
1st, 2nd, 3rd, 4th, etc.: League position
CW: Cup winners

Matches

Preliminary round

Semi-finals

Final

References

DFL-Ligapokal seasons
Ligapokal